is a Japanese footballer currently studying at Meiji University.

Career statistics

Club
.

Notes

References

External links

2002 births
Living people
Association football people from Tokyo
Meiji University alumni
Japanese footballers
Association football midfielders
J3 League players
FC Tokyo players
FC Tokyo U-23 players